Ivan Heshko (born August 19, 1979) is a Ukrainian middle-distance track athlete who specialized in the 1500 meters. He represented Ukraine at the 2004 Summer Olympics and holds multiple Ukrainian records in athletics.

Running career
Heshko started to train at the age of 14. From an early age he had played football and handball, but eventually focused solely on athletics. He achieved his studies at the Teacher's Training College: Kamenets-Podolskiy. A member of an Italian athletic club, he has been trained by Georgiy Mironiouk since 1992, and has five times been the champion of his country, including a bronze medal in 2003 at the World Championships (Paris/Saint-Denis) and silver in the 1500 m at the 2004 IAAF World Indoor Championships in Budapest.

At Athens 2004, Heshko finished fifth in 1500 m. He also competed in 800 meters, but failed to advance in the semi finals. His personal best time of 3:30.33 (1500 m), accomplished during the 2004 meeting of Brussel, is also a Ukrainian national record.

In 2005 Heshko won the European Indoor Championships, the Summer Universiade and the World Athletics Final and finished fourth at the World Championships. He started the next year by winning the World Indoor Championships in Moscow, comfortably ahead of two Kenyan runners, completing 1500 m in 3:42.08.

In August 2006, Heshko won the silver medal at the 2006 European Championships in Athletics in Gothenburg.

See also
Ukraine at the 2004 Summer Olympics

References

External links
 

1979 births
Living people
Ukrainian male middle-distance runners
Athletes (track and field) at the 2000 Summer Olympics
Athletes (track and field) at the 2004 Summer Olympics
Athletes (track and field) at the 2008 Summer Olympics
Olympic athletes of Ukraine
World Athletics Championships medalists
European Athletics Championships medalists
Universiade medalists in athletics (track and field)
Kyiv National University of Trade and Economics alumni
Universiade gold medalists for Ukraine
World Athletics Indoor Championships winners
Medalists at the 2005 Summer Universiade
Sportspeople from Chernivtsi Oblast